The Aeroprakt A-26 Vulcan is a light twin engine aircraft developed from a modified Aeroprakt A-20 light single aircraft. Some models imported to the United States are registered as Spectrum Aircraft SA-26 Vulcan.

Design and development
The A-26 has an extra 3° degree sweepback of the wings from its single engine counterpart, the A-20. The aircraft is powered by two Rotax 503 (eventually Rotax 582) engines in a pusher configuration.

Operational history
An example of the A-26 was demonstrated at the 2000 Experimental Aircraft Association AirVenture airshow in Oshkosh, Wisconsin. Spectrum Aircraft imported versions for the American market.

Variants
The Aeroprakt A-36 Vulcan is an updated factory built Rotax 912S powered twin.

Specifications (variant specified)

References

External links

2000s Ukrainian ultralight aircraft
Vulcan
Twin-engined pusher aircraft
High-wing aircraft